Tmesisternus tolai is a species of beetle in the family Cerambycidae. It was described by Gressitt in 1984.

References

tolai
Beetles described in 1984